Michael Nauenberg (19 December 1934 – 22 July 2019) was an American theoretical physicist and physics historian.

Life
Born to a secular Jewish family in Berlin, his family emigrated to Barranquilla, Colombia in 1939 to escape persecution from the Nazis in World War II.
When he moved to the United States in the 1950s, Nauenberg studied at the Massachusetts Institute of Technology and received his doctorate in 1960 from Cornell University under Hans Bethe with a thesis on particle physics. He then became a visiting fellow at the Institute for Advanced Study. From 1961 to 1965, he was Assistant Professor of Physics at Columbia University. From 1964 to 1966 he was Visiting  Physicist at Stanford Linear Accelerator Center and Stanford University. In 1966 he became Professor of physics at the University of California, Santa Cruz (UCSC). He was also from 1988 to 1994 director of the Institute for Nonlinear Science at UCSC. After his retirement in 1994, he became Research Professor of Physics at UCSC. He was a visiting professor at various research institutions and universities in Europe.

Nauenberg worked in the field of particle and nuclear physics as well as theoretical solid state physics, astrophysics and nonlinear dynamics. His most-cited result, written in collaboration with Nobel laureate Tsung-Dao Lee, is the Kinoshita-Lee-Nauenberg theorem (KLN theorem). Since the 1990s, he has published numerous works on the history of science, especially about physicists from the 17th century. Among them are works on the work of Isaac Newton, Robert Hooke and Christiaan Huygens. In addition, he published contributions to 20th-century physicists, including Edmund Clifton Stoner and Subrahmanyan Chandrasekhar.

From 1963 to 1964 he held a Guggenheim Fellowship, and from 1964 to 1966 he was a Sloan Research Fellow. From 1989 to 1990 he was a scholarship holder of the Alexander von Humboldt Foundation.

References

External links
 Michael Nauenberg, Editorial Team member page at Quanta.
 Homepage at the UCSC
 Entry in the University Library of the UCSC

1934 births
2019 deaths
American physicists
Theoretical physicists
Quantum physicists
Cornell University alumni
German emigrants to the United States
American people of German-Jewish descent